The Battle of the Harrow took place on 26 May 1798 and was the first clash of the Irish Rebellion of 1798 in County Wexford. It was fought between government forces (specifically a unit of Wexford yeoman cavalry, the Camolin Cavalry) and United Irishmen insurgents under the leadership of a local priest, John Murphy who had mobilized following reports of atrocities by the yeomanry during the rebellion led by the United Irishmen revolutionary organisation.

Background 

News of the outbreak of the rebellion to the north had filtered down to County Wexford and was accompanied by the arrival of two military regiments notorious for their brutality: the Royal North Cork Militia and a Welsh fencible cavalry unit known as the Ancient Britons. In addition, regular yeomanry patrols of the countryside and reports of a massacre of prisoners by yeomen in Carnew added to the atmosphere of widespread fear. As a consequence, many people banded together to watch for military patrols or abandoned their homes to hide in the countryside.

One such group, numbering about forty, were gathered by Father John Murphy near the village of The Harrow on the evening of 26 May. Ostensibly the men had come to cut turf for Father Murphy, their local curate, which was a custom at the time. This ruse allowed the men to carry turf cutters, which could serve as rudimentary weapons, but they also had a small number of firearms concealed nearby.

The Fight at The Harrow 

Meanwhile, a patrol of about twenty yeomen (belonging to the Camolin Cavalry) were approaching, alerted by the reports of rebellion and seeking a number of suspected United Irishmen. The yeomen initially passed Fr. Murphy's group without incident, but the bulk of the patrol halted nearby while their commanding officer, a Lieutenant Bookey, together with a private, John Donovan, rode on ahead to the dwelling of one of the suspected United Irishmen. Finding their target was not at home, they set fire to the cabin and then turned back to rejoin their unit. The rebels attacked the yeomanry, killing Bookey and Donovan; the remainder of the patrol fled.

The official version of events was recorded in the entry for 26 May 1798 in the Detail Book of the Camolin Cavalry;

"On arrival in Ferns, Lieut. Smith and a party was ordered towards Scarawalsh, where the murders were committed, to see if this information was true, and Lieut. Bookey with another Party rode towards the Harrow, where he met a large party of Insurgents armed with Pikes and some Arms. The Lieut. rode before the Party, and ordered the rebels to surrender, and deliver up their Arms, on which they discharged a volley at the Party, accompanied with a shower of stones, some of which brought Lieut. Bookey from his horse, as also John Donovan, a private in the Corps. The party after firing a few shots, finding themselves overpowered by the Rebels, retreated to Ferns, where they remained ‘till day break, melancholy spectators of the devastation committed by the Rebels. The information of the Murders at Scarawalsh found to be true."

Sources

H. F. B. Wheeler and A. M. Broadley; The War in Wexford: an account of the rebellion in the south of Ireland in 1798, told from original documents (London 1910) pp. 83–4.

External links 
 1798 Rebellion website

Battles of the Irish Rebellion of 1798
History of County Wexford